The members of the 39th General Assembly of Newfoundland were elected in the Newfoundland general election held in April 1982. The general assembly sat from May 10, 1982 to March 11, 1985.

The Progressive Conservative Party led by Brian Peckford formed the government.

James Russell served as speaker.

There were three sessions of the 39th General Assembly:

William Anthony Paddon served as lieutenant governor of Newfoundland.

Members of the Assembly 
The following members were elected to the assembly in 1982:

Notes:

By-elections 
By-elections were held to replace members for various reasons:

Notes:

References 

Terms of the General Assembly of Newfoundland and Labrador